Baron of Alagoa was a noble title created by Queen Maria II of Portugal by decree on 22 December 1841 in favor of José Francisco da Terra Brum, a wealthy merchant and winegrower from the city of Horta, Faial Island, in the Portuguese archipelago of the Azores. Terra Brum resided along the banks of the Ribeira da Conceição (literally, the Stream of the Immaculate Conception), and owned properties on the so-called Alagoa coastline. Today, the latter area is occupied by the football field of local sports club Fayal Sport.

Following Terra Brum's death on 22 January 1842, his eldest son José Francisco da Terra Brum II became the second Baron of Alagoa. The second Terra Brum died in 1844, extinguishing the title. In 1901, King Carlos I of Portugal reinstated the baronage in favor of Manuel Maria da Terra Brum, José Francisco da Terra Brum's youngest son, and like his father before him one of Pico Island's largest winegrowers and a prominent public figure on both sides of the Faial-Pico Channel. Manuel Maria died without direct heirs on 12 July 1905, the third and last Baron of Alagoa.

List of barons
 José Francisco da Terra Brum, first Baron of Alagoa, 1841–1842;
 José Francisco da Terra Brum II, second Baron of Alagoa, 1842–1844;
 Manuel Maria da Terra Brum, third Baron of Alagoa, 1901–1905.

References 
Notes

Sources
 

Alagoa
Azorean nobility
1841 establishments in Portugal